This is a list of Austrian politicians.


A
Viktor Adler, Social democrat
Hannes Androsch, former vice-chancellor and finance minister (SPÖ)

B
Cesare Battisti, politician and revolutionary
Otto Bauer, politician (social democrat)
Count Leopold von Berchtold, foreign minister at the outbreak of World War I
Walter Breisky, Chancellor (First Republic)
Christian Broda, former justice minister (SPÖ)
Erhard Busek, former vice chancellor and minister of science (ÖVP)
Doris Bures, former first president of the national council of Austria (SPÖ)

C
Richard von Coudenhove-Kalergi, politician and writer

D
Engelbert Dollfuß,  Chancellor (First Republic) and dictator from 1933 to 1934

E
Otto Ender, Chancellor (First Republic)

F
Leopold Figl, former Chancellor and foreign minister (ÖVP)
Heinz Fischer, former Austrian President (SPÖ)
Werner Faymann, former Chancellor of Austria (SPÖ)

G
Eva Glawischnig, politician (Austrian Green Party)
Alfons Gorbach, former chancellor (ÖVP)
Karl-Heinz Grasser, former finance minister
Leopold Gratz, former foreign minister and president of the Nationalrat (SPÖ)
Alfred Gusenbauer, chairman of the Austrian Socialdemocrats (SPÖ)

H
Jörg Haider, politician, right-wing populist (BZÖ)
Michael Hainisch,  Austrian president (First Republic)
Michael Häupl, former mayor of Vienna (SPÖ)
Adolf Hitler,  Leader and Chancellor of Germany from 1933–1945
Norbert Hofer, third president of the national council, former minister of Traffic, Innovation and Technology (FPÖ)

I
Theodor Innitzer, cardinal, archbishop and minister of the First Republic

J
Franz Jonas, former Austrian president

K
Elfriede Karl, former Minister for Family, Youth and Consumer Protection
Ernst Kaltenbrunner, national socialist politician
Christian Kern, former Chancellor, current chairman of the SPÖ
Wenzel Anton Graf Kaunitz, statesman
Andreas Khol, president of the national council (ÖVP)
Herbert Kickl, former minister of the Interior (FPÖ)
Rudolf Kirchschläger, judge, diplomat and former Austrian president
Josef Klaus, former Chancellor (ÖVP)
Melchior Klesl, statesman 16th and 17th century
Thomas Klestil, diplomat and Austrian president
Viktor Klima, former Chancellor (SPÖ)
Heinrich Ritter von Kogerer, Director General of the Austro-Hungarian Empire
Theodor Körner, Former Austrian president
Peter Joseph Kofler, former mayor of Vienna
Bruno Kreisky, former Chancellor (SPÖ)
Sebastian Kurz, former foreign minister, current chairman of the ÖVP and Chancellor

L
Karl Lueger, mayor of Vienna before World War I,  founder of Christian-social party

M
Hans-Peter Martin (born 1957), Member of the European Parliament
Klemens Wenzel Lothar von Metternich (1773 - 1859), Austrian foreign minister, diplomat and statesman
Wilhelm Miklas, last president of the first Republic
Alois Mock, former vice chancellor (ÖVP)

N
Hans Niessl, Landeshauptmann of Burgenland, (SPÖ)

P
Peter Pilz, politician and founder of the "Liste Pilz"
Bruno Pittermann, former vice-chancellor SPÖ
Erwin Pröll, governor of Lower Austria, ÖVP

R
Julius Raab, former Chancellor (ÖVP)
Rudolf Ramek, former Chancellor (first Republic)
Karl Renner, former Chancellor and first Austrian president of the 2nd Republic (SPÖ)
Susanne Riess-Passer, former vice chancellor

S
Adolf Schärf, former Austrian president
Johann Schober, Chancellor (First Republic)
Georg Ritter von Schönerer, radical German-nationalistic politician in the Habsburg monarchy
Kurt von Schuschnigg,  dictator and Chancellor of Austria from 1934 to 1938
Wolfgang Schüssel, Chancellor of Austria (ÖVP)
Arnold Schwarzenegger, 38th Governor of California, United States of America
Ignaz Seipel, former Chancellor (First Republic)
Karl Seitz, Austrian president (First Republic)
Arthur Seyß-Inquart, national socialist politician, last Chancellor before the Anschluss
Fred Sinowatz, former Chancellor (SPÖ)
Gerhard Skiba, Mayor of Braunau am Inn (SPÖ)
Wolfgang Sobotka, Minister of Interior (ÖVP)
Heinz-Christian Strache, current Vice Chancellor (FPÖ)
Ernst Streeruwitz, Chancellor (First Republic)
Thomas Stelzer, Austrian ambassador to Portugal and Cape Verde

V
Alexander Van der Bellen, president of Austria, elected as a party-less candidate in 2016
Franz Vranitzky, former chancellor (SPÖ)

W
Kurt Waldheim, diplomat and politician; former Secretary-General of the United Nations from 1972 to 1982, former President of Austria from 1986 to 1992 born 1918

See also
Politics of Austria
Lists of mayors by country: Austria
List of political parties in Austria
List of Austrians

Politicians